St. Francis Medical Center may refer to:

St. Francis Medical Center (Lynwood), Lynwood, California
St. Francis Medical Center (Colorado Springs), Colorado Springs, Colorado
St. Francis Medical Center (Cape Girardeau), Cape Girardeau, Missouri
St. Francis Medical Center (Grand Island), Grand Island, Nebraska
St. Francis Medical Center (Honolulu), Honolulu, Hawaii
St. Francis Medical Center (Trenton, New Jersey), Trenton, New Jersey
St. Francis Medical Center (Midlothian), Midlothian, Virginia
St. Francis Medical Center (Milwaukee), Milwaukee, Wisconsin
St. Francis Medical Center (Philadelphia), Philadelphia, Pennsylvania
St. Francis Regional Medical Center (Monroe), Monroe, Louisiana
St. Francis Regional Medical Center (Shakopee), Shakopee, Minnesota
OSF Saint Francis Medical Center, Peoria, Illinois

See also
St. Francis Health Center, Topeka, Kansas
St. Francis Hospital (disambiguation)

Trauma centers